Robin Hood: Men in Tights is a 1993 adventure comedy film and a parody of the Robin Hood story. The film was produced and directed by Mel Brooks, co-written by Brooks, Evan Chandler, and J. David Shapiro based on a story by Chandler and Shapiro, and stars Cary Elwes, Richard Lewis, and Dave Chappelle in his film debut. It includes frequent comedic references to previous Robin Hood films, particularly Prince of Thieves (upon which the plot is loosely structured), and the 1938 Errol Flynn adaptation The Adventures of Robin Hood.

The film also features Brooks in a minor role – the first time he had appeared in one of his own films in which he does not receive top billing or play the lead role since Young Frankenstein. In addition to Brooks, it features cameos from Brooks regulars Dom DeLuise, Dick Van Patten, and Rudy De Luca.

Plot
Robin of Loxley is captured during the Crusades and is imprisoned in Jerusalem. With the help of fellow inmate Asneeze, he escapes and frees the other inmates. Upon returning to England, Robin finds Asneeze's son, Ahchoo, and discovers that Prince John has assumed control while King Richard is away fighting in the Crusades. Unbeknownst to Richard, the prince is abusing his power. Robin returns to his family home, Loxley Hall, only to find it being repossessed by John's men. His family's blind servant, Blinkin, informs Robin that his family is dead, and his father left him a key which opens "the greatest treasure in all the land."

Robin recruits Little John and Will Scarlet O'Hara to help regain his father's land and oust Prince John from the throne. On his quest, Robin attracts the attention of Maid Marian of Bagelle, who wants to find the man who has the key to her Everlast chastity belt. They are also joined by Rabbi Tuckman, who shares with them his sacramental wine and bargain circumcisions.

While Robin is training his band of tights-clad Merry Men, the spoonerism-spouting Sheriff of Rottingham hires the mafioso Don Giovanni to assassinate Robin at the Spring Festival. They plan to hold an archery tournament to attract Robin. Maid Marian hears of the plot, and sneaks out of her castle to warn Robin, accompanied by her heavyset, German lady-in-waiting, Broomhilde.

At the archery tournament, a disguised Robin makes it to the final round, but loses after his arrow is split in two by his opponent. Confused that he lost, Robin reviews the movie's script to discover that he gets another shot. Giovanni's assassin attempts to kill Robin by shooting at him with a scoped crossbow from Royal Folio Depository, but Blinkin catches the arrow in midair. Robin then takes the second shot, this time using a special "PATRIOT arrow", hitting the target. Robin is arrested, with Marian promising to marry the Sheriff to spare his life.

Robin and the Merry Men interrupt the wedding between the Sheriff and Maid Marian. She is carried off to the tower by the Sheriff, who wants to deflower her but cannot open her chastity belt. Robin arrives and duels the sheriff, during which Robin's key falls into the lock of Marian's chastity belt.

After winning the fight Robin spares the Sheriff's life only to miss his sheath and accidentally run the Sheriff through. The witch Latrine, Prince John's cook and adviser, saves him by giving him a magical Life Saver in exchange for marriage. Before Robin and Marian can attempt to open the lock, Broomhilde arrives, insisting they get married first. Rabbi Tuckman conducts the ceremony, but they are suddenly interrupted by King Richard, recently returned from the Crusades, who orders Prince John to be taken away to the Tower of London and made part of the tour.

Robin and Marian are married, and Ahchoo is made the new sheriff of Rottingham. That night, Robin and Maid Marian attempt to open the chastity belt, only to discover that even with the key, the lock won't open. The film ends with Robin calling for a locksmith.

Cast

 Cary Elwes as Robin Hood
 Richard Lewis as Prince John
 Roger Rees as Sheriff of Rottingham
 Amy Yasbeck as Maid Marian
 Dave Chappelle as Ahchoo
 Mark Blankfield as Blinkin
 Eric Allan Kramer as Little John
 Matthew Porretta as Will Scarlet O'Hara
 Isaac Hayes as Asneeze
 Tracey Ullman as Latrine
 Patrick Stewart as King Richard
 Dom DeLuise as Don Giovanni
 Steve Tancora as Filthy Luca
 Joe Dimmick as Dirty Ezio
 Dick Van Patten as The Abbot
 Mel Brooks as Rabbi Tuckman
 Megan Cavanagh as Broomhilde
 Avery Schreiber as Tax Assessor
 Chuck McCann as Villager
 Brian George as Dungeon Maitre D'
 Zitto Kazann as Head Saracen Guard
 Richard Assad as Assistant Saracen Guard
 Herman Poppe as Sheriff's Guard
 Clive Revill as Fire Marshall
 Joe Baker as Angry Villager
 Carol Arthur as Complaining Villager
 Kelly Jones as Buxom Lass
 Clement von Franckenstein as Royal Announcer
Robert Ridgely as The Hangman
 Corbin Allred as Young Lad
 Chase Masterson as Giggling Court Lady
 Don Lewis as Mime
 Roger Owens as Peanut Vendor
 Patrick Valenzuela as Lead Camel Jockey
 Steffon as Sherwood Forest Rapper
 David DeLuise as Villager
 Marc Ian Sklar as Merry Man (uncredited)
 Tim Storms as Merry Man (uncredited)

Reception
Vincent Canby of The New York Times wrote, "What's missing is the kind of densely packed comic screenplay that helped to make Young Frankenstein and High Anxiety two of the most delectable movie parodies of the last 20 years. Men in Tights has the manner of something that wasn't argued over long enough. A few good gags are supplemented by dozens of others that still need to be worked on or tossed out entirely." Caryn James wrote, "Men in Tights is not as relentlessly clever and comic as his '70s films, but its funniest moments prove that Mr. Brooks has not lost his shrewd, nutty irreverence." Gene Siskel of the Chicago Tribune gave the film half of one star out of four and called it "a most disappointing Mel Brooks movie parody that suggests that the once hilarious Brooks has lost his way. The pacing is agonizingly slow, and many of the jokes are recycled from his earlier, better work."

Rita Kempley of The Washington Post called it "a pointless and untimely lampoon of Robin Hood: Prince of Thieves from the increasingly creaky spoofmeister Mel Brooks." Peter Rainer of the Los Angeles Times was mixed, writing that "what's enjoyable about the best parts of Men in Tights is its grab-bag, throwaway style", but also finding "something a little dutiful and desperate about portions of the film, as if Brooks were trying to capture an audience he didn't really connect with." Jay Boyar of the Orlando Sentinel called the film "crashingly unfunny" and a sign that "the 67-year old comedian's sense of humor isn't nearly as sharp as it once was." In his book, Reel Bad Arabs, Jack Shaheen saw the movie positively, describing it as a "funny fable" that spoofs Robin Hood: Prince of Thieves, containing "harmless visual and verbal puns".

On review aggregator website Rotten Tomatoes, the film holds an approval rating of 41%, based on 44 reviews, and an average rating of 5.10/10. The critical consensus reads: "Undisciplined, scatological, profoundly silly, and often utterly groan-worthy, Robin Hood: Men in Tights still has an amiable, anything-goes goofiness that has made it a cult favorite." Audiences polled by CinemaScore gave the film an average grade of "B" on an A+ to F scale. Over time, the film has developed a cult following.

Box office
Robin Hood: Men in Tights debuted at number six at the weekend box office in the United States, with a gross of $6.8 million and a total of over $10 million, after opening on the previous Wednesday.  Fox was reportedly "thrilled" with the film's performance.

The film went on to gross $35.7 million in the United States and Canada. It is Brooks' fifth-highest-grossing film.  Internationally it grossed $36.3 million for a worldwide total of $72 million.

Brooks has mentioned that Men in Tights and Spaceballs are his two top-selling films on video in a DVD interview for the latter film.

Soundtrack

Home media
Robin Hood: Men in Tights was released via Laserdisc and VHS in 1994 by Fox Video. A Region 1 DVD was released by 20th Century Fox Home Entertainment and was doubled-featured with Spaceballs on February 6, 2007. Columbia TriStar also released the film on DVDs, VHS and Laserdisc in other territories from 1994 to 2002, while Sony Pictures Home Entertainment re-released the DVDs from 2006 to 2016. The film was released on Blu-ray on May 11, 2010, and was re-released in a DVD Combo Pack on October 1, 2018, in the United States, Fabulous Films on April 22, 2019, in Europe, and Umbrella Entertainment on December 15, 2021, in Australia.

References

External links

 
 
 
 

Robin Hood films
Robin Hood parodies
1993 films
1990s adventure films
1990s parody films
American adventure comedy films
American satirical films
Films directed by Mel Brooks
Films produced by Mel Brooks
American parody films
Films set in England
Films set in the 12th century
American slapstick comedy films
Self-reflexive films
Gaumont Film Company films
Columbia Pictures films
20th Century Fox films
Crusades films
Films about Christianity
Brooksfilms films
Films with screenplays by Mel Brooks
Films about royalty
Cultural depictions of Clint Eastwood
Cultural depictions of Marlon Brando
Films scored by Hummie Mann
Cultural depictions of Richard I of England
1993 comedy films
1990s English-language films
1990s American films